is a Japanese footballer who plays for Shimizu S-Pulse.

Club statistics
Updated to 7 December 2019.

References

External links
Profile at Oita Trinita
 
 
 

1992 births
Living people
Miyazaki Sangyo-keiei University alumni
Association football people from Miyazaki Prefecture
Japanese footballers
J1 League players
J2 League players
J3 League players
Oita Trinita players
Shimizu S-Pulse players
Association football defenders